Galaxiella munda is a species of fish in the family Galaxiidae. It is endemic to inland waters of southwestern Australia, and known as the Western mud minnow.  
In 1999 the Mud Minnow was not included in the list of threatened species under the Environment Protection and Biodiversity Conservation Act, but is listed as Endangered on the IUCN Red List.

Description 
The Mud Minnow has an elongated scaleless body, a white belly and a grey-brown back. A distinctive broad brown stripe starts from behind the eye and ends tailfins base.
The fish has a one-year life-cycle.

A number of informal names exist for this species, galaxias, the Western dwarf galaxias, and western mud minnow. The name mud minnow also refers to the family Lepidogalaxiidae, while swan galaxias can refer to either Galaxiella munda or the Galaxias species G. fontanus.

Habitat
This species is only found in the South West corner of Western Australia, preferring swift-flowing streams in Karri forest. It inhabits coastal rivers, streams, ponds, swamps and ditches between Albany and Ellen Brook. It can tolerate acidic water that is tannin stained and with a pH as low as 3.0.

Diet 
Galaxiella munda is carnivorous and mainly feeds on small insects, aquatic insect larvae and micro-crustaceans.

References

munda
Freshwater fish of Western Australia
Near threatened animals
Endemic fauna of Australia
Fish described in 1978
Taxonomy articles created by Polbot
Endemic fauna of Southwest Australia